One Glorious Scrap is a 1927 American silent Western film directed by Edgar Lewis and written by George H. Plympton, George Morgan, and Gardner Bradford. The film stars Fred Humes, Dorothy Gulliver, Robert McKenzie, Francis Ford, George B. French and Cuyler Supplee. The film was released on November 20, 1927, by Universal Pictures.

Plot

Cast  
 Fred Humes as Larry Day
 Dorothy Gulliver as Joan Curtis
 Robert McKenzie as Professor Parkinson
 Francis Ford as Ralph Curtis
 George B. French as Ezra Kramer 
 Cuyler Supplee as Carl Kramer
 Ben Corbett as Benny
 Gilbert Holmes as Pee Wee 
 Richard L'Estrange as Lazy 
 Scotty Mattraw as Scotty

References

External links

 
 

1927 films
1927 Western (genre) films
Universal Pictures films
Films directed by Edgar Lewis
American black-and-white films
Silent American Western (genre) films
Films with screenplays by George H. Plympton
1920s English-language films
1920s American films